Andrew Putt (born July 30, 1998 in Venetia, Pennsylvania) is an American International motorcycle trials rider.

Biography
Putt started riding at national level in the Junior class in 2011. The following year he won the class and with it his first national title.

In 2013 he moved up to ride in the NATC Expert championship, finishing a creditable 4th position. He almost clinched the title in 2014 with a spirited 2nd place, being held off all season by defending champion Ray Peters.

2015 was to be a big year for Putt, moving up to ride in the Pro class. He ended the season in the runner-up spot behind multi-time champion Patrick Smage, the highlight of his season being two victories in the final two rounds of the series in Wyoming. Putt was also a member of the 2015 American TDN team alongside Bryan Roper, Logan Bolopue and Daniel Blanc-Gonnet who finished in 5th place after traveling to Tarragona, Spain.

All set for an assault on the title for 2016, things didn't quite go as planned for Putt after former world number two Spaniard Marc Freixa joined the series and won the majority of the rounds. His best finish of the season was a 2nd place behind Freixa in Colorado, and he finished the season in 3rd. Putt didn't finish the season empty handed though, winning the annual El Trial de Espana held by the So-Cal Trials Association (SCTA).

National Trials Championship Career

Honors
 US NATC National Junior Champion 2012
 El Trial de Espana winner 2016

References 

1998 births
Living people
American motorcycle racers
Motorcycle trials riders